Capital punishment in the state of Vermont ended in 1972 for all crimes due to Furman v. Georgia and has not been reinstated since. Vermont still has pre-Furman capital statutes on the books but these have been left unenforceable due to Furman. Most states changed their capital punishment laws to conform with Furman and Gregg v. Georgia, but the Vermont legislature has yet to do so, effectively abolishing the death penalty in the state. The state last executed a prisoner, Donald DeMag, in 1954, after he received the sentence for a double robbery-murder he committed after escaping prison.

Although DeMag was the last person executed by Vermont, he was not the last person to be sentenced to death by a Vermont court. Lionel Goyet, a soldier who was Absent Without Leave for the fifth time, robbed and killed a farmhand, and was sentenced to death in 1957.  His sentence was commuted six months later, and Goyet was conditionally pardoned in 1969. He had no further problems with the law, and died of heart failure in 1980.

Vermont still has a pre-Furman statute providing death by electrocution for treason, though the state's execution chamber has since closed.

Summary

See also
 List of people executed in Vermont
 Crime in Vermont
 Law of Vermont

Notes

References 
 Hearn, Daniel Allen, Legal Executions in New England: A comprehensive reference, 1623–1960 (Jefferson, NC: McFarland, 1999).

 
Vermont
Crime in Vermont
Vermont law